The men's 400 metres hurdles event at the 2005 Asian Athletics Championships was held in Incheon, South Korea on September 2–4.

Medalists

Results

Heats

Final

References
Results

2005 Asian Athletics Championships
400 metres hurdles at the Asian Athletics Championships